"Stickeen: An Adventure with a Dog and a Glacier" (1897) is a short memoir by American naturalist John Muir. It is about a trip he took in Alaska (1880) with a dog named Stickeen and their outing together on a glacier. It is one of Muir's best-known writings, and is now considered a classic dog story.

It was first published in The Century Illustrated Monthly Magazine in September 1897 (V. 54, No. 5), under the title "An Adventure with a Dog and a Glacier". The editor cut out parts of the original manuscript so Muir attempted a reconstruction when it was republished in expanded book form in 1909 as Stickeen. A slightly shortened version of the 1909 edition was published in his 1915 Travels in Alaska. Ronald Limbaugh's book, John Muir's "Stickeen" and the Lessons of Nature (1996) reconstructs the original manuscript submitted by Muir in 1897. Many later editions were printed throughout the 20th century that included artwork, children's adaptions, audio, music and video.

Muir felt it was the hardest thing he ever tried to write. Muir saw Stickeen as "the herald of a new gospel" adding "in all my wild walks, seldom have I had a more definite or useful message to bring back."

Editions and adaptions

References

External links
 
 
 
 

1909 non-fiction books
Outdoor literature
Books about Alaska
John Muir
American memoirs
American travel books